The men's Mass Start at the 2023 KNSB Dutch Single Distance Championships took place in Heerenveen at the Thialf ice skating rink on Sunday 5 February 2023. There were 22 participants. Jorrit Bergsma and Harm Visser qualified for the 2023 ISU World Speed Skating Championships in Heerenveen.

Result

 DNF = Did not finish
 NC = No classification
Referee: Wycher Bos.  Assistant: Björn Fetlaar.  Starter: Wim van Biezen. 

Source:

References

Single Distance Championships
2023 Single Distance